Robert 'Bob' Hancock (born 26 August 1942) is a former Australian rules footballer who played with North Melbourne in the Victorian Football League (VFL) during the 1960s.

References

External links

1942 births
Living people
North Melbourne Football Club players
Bairnsdale Football Club players
Australian rules footballers from Victoria (Australia)